Ethylestradiol, or 17α-ethylestradiol, also known as 17α-ethylestra-1,3,5(10)-triene-3,17β-diol, is a synthetic estrogen which was never marketed. It occurs as an active metabolite of the anabolic steroids norethandrolone and ethylestrenol formed via aromatase and is believed to be responsible for the estrogenic effects of norethandrolone and ethylestrenol. The 3-methyl ether of ethylestradiol has been used as an intermediate in the synthesis of certain 19-nortestosterone anabolic steroids.

See also 
 List of estrogens
 5α-Dihydronorethandrolone

References 

Abandoned drugs
Estranes
Human drug metabolites
Synthetic estrogens
1-Ethylcyclopentanols